Cuevo is a small town in the Andes in Bolivia. In 2010 it had an estimated population of 2,317.

References

Populated places in Santa Cruz Department (Bolivia)